Gokarna is a small temple town located in Uttara Kannada district of Karnataka state in India, It has a population of around 20,000. The main temple and deity is Shiva, who is also known as Mahabaleshwara. This temple houses what is believed to be original image of Shiva's linga (Atmalinga).

Gokarna is known as one of the seven important Hindu pilgrimage centers. It is on what was once an unspoiled beach near the estuary of the river Aghanashini. Recently, due to the influx of tourists, the character of the town has changed; it is no longer just a centre of pilgrimage, though large numbers of devotees visit to offer prayers and worship to Shiva.

Due to its laid-back, unspoiled and rustic nature many younger western tourists started visiting Gokarna about three decades ago. Enterprising locals started stores and restaurants. Later the onset of millennial youth increased the tourism. Now the resorts also cater to wealthier tourists.

Etymology 

Gokarna means cow's ear. It is believed that Shiva emerged from the ear of a cow (Prithvi, the Mother Earth) here. It is at the ear-shaped confluence of two rivers Gangavali and Aghanashini.

The Bhagavata Purana relates that 200 years into this current kali yuga a pious brahmana named Atmaveda was unable because of karma incurred in past lives to have any children in his current incarnation. Atmaveda was devastated by not being able to have children, and wandered into a forest to pray for help. There he met a Sannyasi, whom he implored to grant him and his wife the ability to have a child. The Sannyasi warned Atmaveda against opposing his karma, but finally relented and gave Atmaveda a fruit that his wife was to consume to have a child. Atmaveda's wife Dhundhuli did not want to go through the pain of pregnancy and childbirth, so she gave the fruit from the Sannyasi to her cow. A human child was born of the cow, human in all its parts except for its ears, which were cow ears. Because of this the child was named Gokarna.

Gokarna is mentioned in the Shrimad Bhagavata Purana as being the home of the brothers Gokarna and Dhundhakari.

In order that Brahma who out of arrogance arising out of his power to create the universe, sat penancing to redeem himself from curse of Shiva, the latter appeared in front of him from the ears of a cow. So the place came to be known as Gokarna or ear of the cow. Hindu Puranas says that when Parashurama, the sixth avatar of Vishnu created Kerala, it was from Gokarna to Kanyakumari.

As per legend, Ravana was given Atmalinga by Shiva and instructed that it would stay permanently where it is first placed on the land. But Ganesha came in the form of a boy and planted it in Gokarna while Ravana was performing rituals. Once placed Ravana could not remove it from the ground, but he removed some pieces of the Linga and threw them in different directions.

Geography

Legend 
The earliest history of the city is in Treta Yuga, Ravana (Demon/Asura King of Lanka) reaches Kailasa and performed rigorous penance to get the "Atma Linga" from Shiva, as Ravana's mother expressed a keen desire to worship the atmalinga of Lord Shiva. After a long penance, Shiva gave the Atma linga to Ravana as a boon and instructs Ravana to carry it home by walk, that he should never place it on the earth even for a short while failing which the linga would get eternally embedded at the place where he broke his commands.

Maha Vishnu learned that Ravana will become all powerful by worshipping the 'Atma Linga' and menace to the world and Ravana's conviction that nobody could defeat him, once he acquired the very power of Shiva. Maha Vishnu devised a plan to install the linga somewhere and as he thought that Ganapati was alone capable of doing it, he along with all the gods pleads Ganapati to execute the plan. Ganapati accepts and reaches Gokarna as a Brahmin boy.

As Ravana was nearing Gokarna, Maha Vishnu who had known well that Ravana was punctual in performing his periodical rites (Sandyavandhana), hides sun with his Sudarshana Chakra (Wheel). Thinking that it was time to perform the evening rites, Ravana finds a Brahmin boy and asked him to hold the Atmalinga in his hand until he came back after finishing the rites. Ganapati agreed to hold the linga on one condition that he would do so until he would be able to bear the weight of linga and that thereafter he would call Ravana three times and if failed to come to him by then he would place the linga on the earth.

Ganapati calls Ravana three times when he was performing his rites and places the linga on the earth and he vanishes. The Atmalinga at once got firmly entrenched in the earth. Ravana learned that he had been tricked by the Gods. The depressed demon king Ravana was deeply agitated and tried to pull up the linga, but the linga did not budge a little. It resulted in his throwing the coverings of the Linga to Dhareshwara, Gunavanteshwara, Murudeshwara and Shejjeshwar temples. Ravana was unable to lift the linga from the ground again and called the Shiva linga as Mahabala, one with great strength, and ever since, the linga illustrious as Mahabaleshwara. Shiva learned all these from Vayu Deva, the god of wind, and came on to Earth with Goddess Parvathi devi and his train of Gods, he visited these five places and worshipped the linga which had now taken five forms. He acknowledged that these five places would be his "Pancha Kshetras" (Five Holy Places).

Gokarna  was part of the Sodhe and Vijayanagar kingdoms. When the Konkan region — including Goa — was occupied by the Portuguese, it became part of their rule.

Location 

Gokarna is about 238 km north of Mangalore, 483 km from Bengaluru and about 59 km from Karwar. It is between the Gangavali and Agnashini rivers along the Karwar coast by the Arabian Sea. It is 200 km north from the college towns of Suratkal and Manipal.

Gokarna can be reached by buses and maxicabs from Kumta (30 km), Ankola (26 km), Karwar (59 km) and Bhatkal (88 km) on National Highway 66 (NH-66). Karnataka State Road Transport Corporation (KSRTC) runs long-journey buses from cities like Panaji, Bengaluru and Mangalore. Private buses (Vijayanand Roadlines - VRL, Sugama, Sea Bird, etc.) operate night journeys from the capital city of Bengaluru to Gokarna daily.

It can be reached by Konkan Railway on the Mumbai to Mangalore route or Goa to Mangalore route. The railway station (called Gokarna Road) is 10 km from the town. The station has a retiring room at a nominal price. Many important trains like Matsyagandha Express, KSR Bengaluru Karwar Express, Poorna Express, Marusagar Express and Mangalore Local and DEMU local are the Daily Local Trains halt here.

The nearest airports are Hubli Airport, Karnataka which has domestic flights only, Goa International Airport at Goa and Mangalore International Airport at Bajpe, Karnataka are the nearest airports to reach at Gokarna.

Neighbouring villages are Bankikodla-Hanehalli, Sanikatta, Tadadi, Torke, Madangere, Maskeri, Adigone, Nelaguni and Bijjur.

Climate

Beaches 
The drive up the winding path that leads to Gokarna is scenic, with the rocky mountains and Western Ghats on one side and the Arabian Sea on the other. Gokarna is known for the beaches. The Gokarna main beach is in town and Kudle beach are west facing. Om beach, Half moon Beach, Paradise Beach (also known as Full moon) and Belekan beach are south facing.

The Gokarna beach forms the coast of the town and is followed by Main beach in northern direction while the other four beaches lie to the south. Gokarna Main Beach is mainly used by Indian pilgrims. Main Beach is a long open beach, known for surfing. Kudle and Om are around 6 km from Gokarna town along a muddy hill; they are accessible by rickshaw or foot. Half moon and Paradise are beyond Om beach and are accessible only by trekking or boat. Om beach is named so because it is shaped like the auspicious ॐ Om symbol. Om beach is a naturally Om-shaped beach, it attracts local tourists on weekends. It has a few shacks and eateries, and also boat service to other beaches.

See also 
 Bhookailasa (1940 film)
 Murudeshwara
 Apsarakonda
 Karwar
 Mangalore
 Om Parvat

References 

 Source: Karnataka State Gazetteer 1983

External links

 Gokarn Math
 Official Website of Gokarna Temple 
 tour guide Gokarna Temple

Villages in Uttara Kannada district
Beaches of Karnataka
Tourist attractions in Uttara Kannada district
Geography of Uttara Kannada district